The Oxon Hill–Fort Washington Line, designated Route P18, P19, is a weekday only bus route operated by the Washington Metropolitan Area Transit Authority between Fort Washington Park & Ride Lot and Southern Avenue station of the Green Line of the Washington Metro. The line operates every 20–30 minutes during the weekday peak hours and 60 minutes during the weekday midday. Route P18 and P19 trips are roughly 45 minutes.

Background
Routes P18 and P19 operate weekdays only between Fort Washington Park & Ride Lot and Southern Avenue station, mostly operating along Oxon Hill Road, Indian Head Highway, and Southern Avenue. Route P18 operates all day on weekdays while route P19 operates weekday peak-hours only in the peak-direction only. A limited stop segment is run between Southern Avenue station and Indian Head Highway at all times serving only three stops in each direction.

Routes P18 and P19 currently operate out of Shepherd Parkway division.

P18 Stops

History
The line was created during the 1970s in order to provide service to Downtown DC to Fort Washington. Routes P17, P18, and P19 were created to run the new Oxon Hill–Fort Washington Line. Routes P17 and P19 operated during the weekday peak-hours between Fort Washington Park & Ride Lot and Farragut Square via Oxon Hill Road, Indian Head Highway, and South Capitol Street. Route P18 operated between Fort Washington Park & Ride Lot and Bolling Air Force Base. Routes P17 and P19 operated during weekday peak-hours in the peak direction while route P18 operated during the weekday midday.

Routes P17 and P18 operates along Tantallon Drive, Creek Road, Gable Lane and Fort Foote Road while route P19 remains straight along Oxon Hill Road. Route P17 and P19 operates a limited stop segment between the Oxon Hill Park & Ride and Washington DC and had several boarding and alighting restrictions to passengers.

1991 Service Changes
On December 28, 1991, route P18 was diverted along Firth Sterling Avenue to serve Anacostia station when it opened.

2001 Service Changes
On January 13, 2001, route P19 was rerouted between Fort Washington and Oxon Hill Park & Ride lots to operate via East Swann Creek, Fort Washington, Livingston and Oxon Hill Roads. Routes P17 and P18 were not affected.

2014 Proposed Changes
In 2014 during WMATA's FY2015 budget, WMATA proposed to reroute P18 to Southern Avenue station via Southern Avenue in order to improve connectivity in southern Prince George's County and to Shifting to Southern Avenue Station will help alleviate crowding at Anacostia station. Another option was to transfer the P18 to TheBus and being rerouted to Southern Avenue station.

Also WMATA proposed to eliminate existing boarding and alighting restrictions and instead create a limited stop segment between the Oxon Hill Park & Ride and South Capitol & O Streets for routes P17 and P19 because the existing boarding and alighting restrictions are confusing for passengers and operators and creating a limited stop segment would preserve the “express” nature of the route in a more easy to understand way.

2015 Service Changes
On June 21, 2015, route P18 was diverted along Southern Avenue to serve Southern Avenue station discontinuing service to Anacostia station. Routes P17 and P19 also discontinue the boarding and alighting restrictions and instead had a limited stop segment created between the Oxon Hill Park & Ride and South Capitol & O Streets.

2016 Proposed Changes
During WMATA's FY2018 budget, WMATA proposed to either eliminate the Oxon Hill–Fort Washington Line or discontinue service to Downtown DC being rerouted to Southern Avenue station. WMATA would also charge the local fare for routes P17 and P19 as express service would be discontinued if it was rerouted to Southern Avenue. This was in order to reduce costs and it has a high subsidy per rider. Performance measures for WMATA goes as the following:

The line would later be saved in 2017.

2017 Service Changes
Beginning on June 25, 2017, service to Downtown DC was discontinued. Route P19 was rerouted along Southern Avenue to serve Southern Avenue station alongside route P18 keeping its same routing between Oxon Hill Pike & Ride and Fort Washington Park & Ride. Route P17 was discontinued and replaced by route P18 which added weekday peak hour service in both directions. P19 would still operate in the weekday peak-hour direction during the changes.

Express fares for route P19 was also discontinued and the limited stop segment was also discontinued with all trips becoming local.

New Limited Stop Segment
Beginning on August 7, 2017, in response to customer feedback, routes P18, P19, and W14 implemented a new limited stop segment along Southern Avenue between Southern Avenue station and Indian Head Highway serving only three stops in each direction. Local service is provided by routes A6, A7, D12, D13, D14, NH1, and P12.

2020 Proposed changes
On September 26, 2020, WMATA proposed to eliminate all route P19 service and replace them with route P18 due to low federal funding. Route P19 has not operated since March 17, 2020 due to Metro's response to the COVID-19 pandemic.

Incidents
 On November 27, 2015, at around 1:55 PM, a man was hit by a P18 bus at the intersection of Southern Avenue SE, and Indian Head Highway suffering serious injuries.
 On September 28, 2017, a P18 bus stalled and lost all power to the bus causing it to crash. The accident lead to WMATA pulling its 105 NABI 42-BRT buses from revenue service for two months.

References

P18